Dyane is a census town in Nashik district  in the state of Maharashtra, India.

Demographics 
As of the 2001 India census, Dyane had a population of 24,837. Males constitute 51% of the population and females 49%. Dyane has an average literacy rate of 58%, lower than the national average of 59.5%: male literacy is 64% and, female literacy is 51%. In Dyane, 20% of the population is under 6 years of age.

References 

Cities and towns in Nashik district